

2006

+ Win Forfeited
† Homecoming

2007

† Homecoming

2008

Previous season

The Raiders experienced their first winning season since head coach Jeff Olson resigned to become the defensive coordinator at nearby North Medford High School.

Pre-season

June 3 - 12 players from the upcoming 2008 Raiders' team were named to the NAIA All-Independent Pre-season football team. Six of which were named to the first team: Darryl Price, Brian Harding, Jordan Meyers, Anthony Scolamieri, Danson Cappo and Steve Palmer. The players named to the second team were Bryan Lee-Lauduski, Trent Henson, Will Watson, Ben Baker, Damario Watson and Corey O’Neil. A total of ten teams comprise the All-Independent team: Southern Oregon University, Azusa Pacific University, Southern Virginia University, Edward Waters College, Webber International University, Waldorf College, Southwestern Assemblies of God University, Haskell Indian Nations University, Peru State College and Kentucky Christian University.

During the season

September 2 - Two Southern Oregon players, QB Brian Lee-Lauduski and SS Jason Young, chosen as the offensive and defensive players of the week for their performances against Montana Tech.

September 8 - Senior Defensive End Anthony Scolamieri was chosen as the NAIA Independent Defensive Player of the Week for his performance against Humboldt State.

September 15 - Senior Punter Steve Palmer was named the NAIA Independent Special Teams Player of the Week for his performance against Sacramento State. Palmer had an 81-yard punt which ranks as the second longest is school history.

September 23 - Senior RB Marlon Rosales was chosen as the NAIA Independent Offensive Player of the Week for his performance against Willamette.

Schedule

{

Offense
Rushing

Passing

Receiving

Defense

Special teams

References

Southern Oregon Raiders football seasons